Brock Bolen (born March 24, 1985) is a former American football fullback. He was signed by the Jacksonville Jaguars as an undrafted free agent in 2009. He played college football at University of Illinois and at Louisville.

High school career

Valley View High School
Ranked the No. 1 fullback by Tom Lemming coming out of Valley View High School where he rushed for 2,087 yards and 40 touchdowns as a senior, while running for 2,287 yards and 43 touchdowns during his junior campaign. He totaled 6,099 yards and 108 touchdowns during his high school career and was a three-time Most Valuable Player. Voted first-team All-State by the Dayton Daily News and Middletown Journal Herald, Brock Bolen garnered first-team All-District, All-League, All-Conference honors and was a PrepStar All-Region selection. He set seven school rushing and scoring records and was the Middletown Journal's Player of the Year and was named the nation's top high school fullback his senior year.

College career

Louisville Cardinals
Solid two-year performer at running back after transferring from Illinois... versatile back who runs with power and can catch the ball out of the backfield... finished second on the team in rushing... has two 100-yard rushing games at Louisville.

Professional career

Jacksonville Jaguars
Bolen was signed as an undrafted free agent by the Jacksonville Jaguars on April 26, 2009. He was signed to the Jaguars' practice squad on September 6, 2009. On December 14, Bolen was promoted to the active roster. Bolen spent the 2012 season on injured reserve.

Cleveland Browns
On July 24, 2013, Bolen signed with the Cleveland Browns. On August 19, 2013, Bolen was cut by the Browns.

Personal life
Bolen is married to his wife, Haley. They reside in Waynesville, Ohio with their daughters Avery and Harper, and Boxer puppies, Diesel and Nellie.  

Bolen's father Jim is a retired US Army Special Forces soldier who served in Vietnam and went on to an adventuresome career before settling down in the US.  That period of his life is chronicled in the autobiography, No Guts No Glory.

References

External links
 Jacksonville Jaguars Bio
 Louisville Cardinals bio

1985 births
Living people
People from Germantown, Ohio
Players of American football from Ohio
American football fullbacks
Louisville Cardinals football players
Jacksonville Jaguars players
Cleveland Browns players
People from Piqua, Ohio
People from Waynesville, Ohio